The Roman fish salting factory was a salting factory established on the seafront of Algeciras, southeastern Spain by the Romans. It belonged to the fishing village of San Nicolás, part of what was called Caetaria. A site of archaeological and historical interest, it was declared a Bien de Interés Cultural site on 27 June 2002.

References

Buildings and structures in Algeciras
Bien de Interés Cultural landmarks in the Province of Cádiz
Archaeological sites in Andalusia
Roman archaeology